John Rashleigh (21 January 1619 – 13 March 1693) of Coombe, near Fowey in Cornwall, was MP for Fowey from 1661 to 1679. He was a member of a branch of the more prominent Rashleigh family of Menabilly, near Fowey.

Rashleigh was the only surviving son of Robert Rashleigh (1585 – c. 1667), MP, of Coombe, near Fowey, Cornwall, by his first wife Mary Trefusis, daughter of Thomas Trefusis of Landew.

He matriculated at Brasenose College, Oxford in 1637 and entered Gray's Inn in 1639.

He married in 1642 his cousin Elizabeth, the daughter of Jonathan Rashleigh of Menabilly, Cornwall and had 5 sons and 2 daughters

References

Vivian's Visitations of Cornwall (Exeter: William Pollard & Co, 1887) 

1619 births
1693 deaths
Alumni of Brasenose College, Oxford
Members of Gray's Inn
Members of the pre-1707 English Parliament for constituencies in Cornwall
English MPs 1661–1679
John